Dia C. Forrester is a retired lawyer who served as Grenada’s Attorney General from 1 January 2021 until 1 July 2022, following the 2022 general election.

Early life and education
Forrester is the daughter of cultural activist Don Charles and Agnes Forrester. She has a Bachelor of Laws with Honours from the University of the West Indies Cave Hill, a Legal Education Certificate of Merit from Hugh Wooding Law School and a Master of Laws in International Banking and Finance law from University College London. She was also a national table tennis player and OECS table tennis team champion.

Career
Forrester has been a member of the Grenada bar since 2008, and the Saint Kitts and Nevis and Anguilla bar since 2013, practicing in banking and finance law, commercial and civil litigation, taxation, insolvency and intellectual properly law. She has served on the Grenada National Anti-doping Organisation and the Caribbean Regional Anti-Doping Organisation. She was a partner at the law firm Daniel Brantley. In March 2020, she was named as a defendant in a corruption and breach of confidentiality lawsuit filed in Colorado against St Kitts and Nevis Foreign Affairs Minister Mark Brantley by America 2030 Capital Limited. The suit was dismissed on 7 May 2020.

Forrester was Solicitor General of Grenada from April 2019 until December 2020, representing the government in negotiations and before courts. In August 2020, she participated in the inaugural Women in Politics Leadership Institute at the US Embassy in Barbados.

Forrester was appointed attorney general by Prime Minister Keith Mitchell on 31 December 2020, to commence on 1 January 2021, replacing Darsham Ramdhani who stepped down to serve as a judge. Forrester became the first woman to hold the post.

References

External links
 Government profile

Living people
Year of birth missing (living people)
Female table tennis players
University of the West Indies alumni
Alumni of University College London
Solicitors general
Female justice ministers
Attorneys General of Grenada
21st-century Grenadian lawyers
21st-century women lawyers